Foot Locker Retail, Inc. is an American sportswear and footwear retailer, with its headquarters in Midtown Manhattan, New York City, and operating in  28 countries.

Although established in 1974, and founded as a separate company in 1988, Foot Locker's roots date to 1879, as it is a successor corporation to the F. W. Woolworth Company (“Woolworth's”), which changed its name to Foot Locker in 2001, as many of its freestanding stores were Kinney Shoes and Woolworth's locations. The company operates the eponymous “Foot Locker” chain of athletic footwear retail outlets (along with “Kids Foot Locker” and “Lady Foot Locker” stores),  and other athletic-based divisions including Champs Sports, Footaction USA, House of Hoops, and Eastbay/Footlocker.com, which owns the rights to Final-Score. The company is also famous for its employees' uniforms at its flagship Foot Locker chain, resembling those of referees.

According to the company's filings with the SEC, as of January 28, 2017, Foot Locker, Inc. had 3,363 primarily mall-based stores in the United States, Canada, Europe, and Asia.  Nearly 70% of its products are from Nike.

History 
In 1963, the F. W. Woolworth Company purchased the Kinney Shoe Corporation and operated it as a subsidiary. In the 1960s, Kinney branched into specialty shoe stores, including Stylco in 1967, Susie Casuals in 1968, and Foot Locker on September 12, 1974. The first Foot Locker opened in the Puente Hills Mall in City of Industry, California. Woolworth also diversified its portfolio of specialty stores in the 1980s, including Afterthoughts, Northern Reflections, Rx Place, and Champs Sports. By 1989, the company pursued an aggressive strategy of multiple specialty store formats targeted at enclosed shopping malls.  The idea was that if a particular concept failed at a given mall, the company could quickly replace it with a different concept. The company aimed for ten stores in each of the country's major shopping malls, but this never came to pass as Woolworth never developed that many successful specialty store formats.

In 1988, the F.W. Woolworth Company incorporated a separate company called the Woolworth Corporation in the state of New York. The Woolworth Corporation was responsible for the operations of the Foot Locker stores, among the other specialty chains operated by Woolworth's.  One of its first moves was the acquisition of Champs Sports and renaming itself the Woolworth Athletic Group.

During the 1980s and 1990s, the F.W. Woolworth Company's flagship department store chain fell into decline, ultimately culminating in the closure of the last stores operating under the name of Woolworth's in the United States in 1997. Deciding to continue aggressive expansion into the athletic business in the following years, the company acquired Eastbay in 1997, which was the largest athletic catalog retailer in the United States, as well as subsequent purchases of regional storefront retailers Sporting Goods (purchased in 1997) and The Athletic Fitters (purchased in 1998). After 1997, Wal-Mart replaced Woolworth in the Dow Jones average.  The Woolworth Corporation remained the parent company of Foot Locker, and in 1998 it changed its name to "Venator Group, Inc."  By the 1990s, Foot Locker was responsible for more than 70 percent of Kinney Shoe Corp. sales, while traditional shoe retailer Kinney was in decline. Venator announced shuttering of the remaining Kinney Shoe and Footquarters stores on September 16, 1998.

On February 12, 1999, a federal jury in Austin awarded $341,000 to a former Foot Locker shoe store manager who said the company systematically discriminated against its African American employees by offering more opportunities for promotions to white managers.

As the "Foot Locker" brand had become the Woolworth/Venator company's top performing line, on November 2, 2001, Venator changed its name to Foot Locker, Inc. On November 19, 2004, Foot Locker announced that its quarterly profit rose 19 percent, helped by stronger sales.

In 2004, Foot Locker acquired the Footaction USA brand and approximately 350 stores from Footstar for $350 million. On April 14, 2004, Foot Locker Inc. announced that it agreed to buy about 350 Footaction stores from bankrupt Footstar Inc. for $160 million to expand in urban areas.

On January 10, 2005, the company announced that Nick Grayston was promoted to President and Chief Executive Officer of its 
Foot Locker U.S. division, succeeding Tim Finn, who retired from the company.

In 2007, Foot Locker joined with schoolPAX to launch the Foot Locker School Rewards Program, designed to provide charitable donations to schools who sign up and shop at Foot Locker with a custom-coded key tag or school code.

Foot Locker purchased CCS, a skateboarding equipment retailer, from Alloy for $103 million in cash.

In 2011, Foot Locker joined DoSomething.Org for the Foot Locker Scholar Athletes program, which honors high school athletes for demonstrating academic excellence and flexing their hearts on their sports teams and in their communities.

On June 26, 2012, Foot Locker celebrated the 100th anniversary of the first stock offering made by its predecessor, the F. W. Woolworth Company, on the New York Stock Exchange by ringing the Closing Bell for the trading day.

In 2013, the company acquired the German retailer Runners Point Group.

After not meeting corporate expectations, Foot Locker planned to close its CCS unit but sold it to Daddies Board Shop in 2014.

Foot Locker has steadily risen in Fortune 500 rank, from 446 in 2011 to 363 in 2018. Foot Locker recorded a record turnover of 7.151 million dollars at the end of the fiscal year 2015.

In 2019, Foot Locker invested $100 million in GOAT, an online resale marketplace for sneakers. In 2021, Foot Locker acquired Los Angeles-based athletic retailer WSS and Tokyo-based Atmos. In 2022, Foot Locker announced it would aim to achieve net zero emissions by 2050.

Several Foot Locker stores were damaged in rioting and looting, with two locations destroyed by arson, during the George Floyd protests in Minneapolis–Saint Paul in May 2020.

Stores

References

External links

History of Kinney Shoes

 
Retail companies of the United States
Athletic shoe brands
Clothing retailers of the United States
Shoe companies of the United States
Sporting goods retailers of the United States
Skateboarding companies
F. W. Woolworth Company
Companies based in New York City
American companies established in 1974
Retail companies established in 1974
1974 establishments in California
Companies listed on the New York Stock Exchange
Shoe brands
Footwear retailers of the United States